The 4th Operations Group (4 OG) is the flying component of the 4th Fighter Wing, assigned to the United States Air Force Air Combat Command. The group is stationed at Seymour Johnson Air Force Base, North Carolina.

The 4 OG is a direct descendant of the World War II 4th Fighter Group, the United States Army Air Forces VIII Fighter Command unit formed from the members of the Royal Air Force (RAF) Eagle Squadrons. These fighter squadrons of the Royal Air Force formed prior to the United States entry into World War II with volunteer pilots from the United States.

When the United States entered the war these units, and the American pilots in them, were transferred to the United States Eighth Air Force, with the RAF Nos. 71, 121, and 133 Squadrons becoming the 334th, 335th and 336th Fighter Squadrons of the 4th Fighter Group, 65th Fighter Wing of the VIII Fighter Command.

Today, the 4 OG consists of two operational fighter squadrons, the 335th and 336th; two fighter training squadrons, the 333d and 334th; and two support squadrons. The group provides command and control for two operational F-15E Strike Eagle squadrons and is responsible for conducting the Air Force's only F-15E training operation, qualifying crews to serve in worldwide combat-ready positions.

Assigned Units

The 4th Operations Group (Tail Code: SJ) consists of the following squadrons:

 333d Fighter Squadron "Lancers" F-15E (Red tail stripe)
 Activated on 8 December 1957. F-15E training squadron
 334th Fighter Squadron "Fighting Eagles" F-15E (Blue tail stripe)
 Established 22 August 1942, formerly No. 71 Squadron RAF. F-15E training squadron
 335th Fighter Squadron "Chiefs" F-15E (Green tail stripe)
 Established 22 August 1942, formerly No. 121 Squadron RAF, F-15E operational squadron
 336th Fighter Squadron "Rocketeers" F-15E (Yellow tail stripe)
 Established 22 August 1942, formerly No. 133 Squadron RAF, F-15E operational squadron

 4th Operations Support Squadron
 Responsible for all facets of airfield operations, air traffic control, weather, aircrew life support and training, weapons and tactics training, airspace scheduling, range ops and wing flying hour program.
 4th Training Squadron

History
 For additional history, see Eagle Squadrons and 4th Fighter Wing

World War II

The unit was activated in England in September 1942. The initial cadre for the group were former U.S. members of RAF Eagle Squadrons who had served in combat over Europe from October 1942 to April 1945.

The American fliers of the Eagle Squadrons, which had begun fighting ten months before the Attack on Pearl Harbor, were taken into the U.S. Army Air Forces to form the 4th Fighter Group (FG)- based upon VIII Fighter Command order of 12 September 1942. This VIII Fighter Command order originated based upon the recommendation and urgent requirements provided by Brigadier General Hunter and his USAAF staff at RAF Bushey Hall. An official joint RAF/USAAF ceremony was conducted at RAF North Weald, near to the town of Epping, Essex, at noon, Tuesday, 29 September 1942. It was held after a typical brisk English rainstorm that left a misty, overcast sky and wet grounds for the remainder of the day. The ceremony was held adjacent to the airfield administration building on the concrete parking area. Present at this ceremony included USAAF leaders Brigadier General Frank O'Driscoll Hunter and Major General Carl A. Spaatz, Brigadier General Ira C. Eaker, U.S. and English war correspondents, Air Marshal Harold Edwards (RCAF officer), along with Air Chief Marshal Sir Sholto Douglas, RAF. The ceremony officiated both the commissioning of the 4th Fighter Group under the command of Colonel Edward W. Anderson (Manhattan, Kansas) USAAF, and the establishment of the airfield as a new airbase of the 4th Fighter Group. With such ceremonies presentation of awards are usually conducted. Along with Colonel Anderson, Brigadier General Hunter stepped forward and awarded these combat-experienced American pilots. Squadron commander William James Daley (Hemphill, Texas) was made a major in the USAAF and given his USAAF pilot wings, commencing command of the 335th FS that afternoon. The two other squadron commanders promoted to major and given their USAAF pilot wings of the USAAF were Carroll Warren McColpin (Buffalo New York) of the 336th FS, and Gregory Agustus "Gus" Daymond (Great Falls, Montana) of the 334th FS. The remaining 31 American pilots received their USAAF wings, as well.

Following this award presentation, Air Marshal Douglas, who had earlier complained to Lieutenant General Henry H. Arnold accusing these very same combat-experienced American pilots as prima donnas, stepped forward to the BBC and U.S. microphones with his typed-speech in hand and spoke to the assembled joint air force officers and enlisted personnel standing at attention on the wet concrete flightline. Paying tribute to these American pilots in his typical clipped, political speech he said:

Douglas was followed by General Spaatz who gave an official welcome to his battle-proven American fighter pilots:

After these two speeches, the Royal Air Force and newly established 4th Fighter Group personnel marched by in "pass & review". Following the closing of this ceremony, pilots and guests were shown the new USAAF star (refer to: USAAF unit identification aircraft markings) that was earlier painted over the RAF emblem on the Spitfire V aircraft of the newly created 334th, 335th and 336th USAAF squadrons.

The 4th Fighter Group began its historic rise to fame primarily following the appointment of Donald Blakeslee as the Group's Commander on 1 January 1944.  Blakeslee successfully had the group re-equipped with Mustangs, and it is almost certain that on 6 March 1944, he was the first American plane over Berlin in his Mustang.  The Fourth destroyed more enemy planes in the air and on the ground than any other fighter group of Eighth Air Force. The group operated first with Spitfires but changed to P-47s in March 1943 and to P-51s in late February early March 1944.

On numerous occasions the 4 FG escorted B-17/B-24 bombers that attacked factories, submarine pens, V-weapon sites, and other targets in France, the Low Countries, or Germany. The group went out sometimes with a small force of bombers to draw up the enemy's fighters so they could be destroyed in aerial combat. At other times the 4th attacked the enemy's air power by strafing and dive-bombing airfields. They also hit troops, supply depots, roads, bridges, rail lines, and trains.

The unit participated in the intensive campaign against the German Air Force and aircraft industry during Big Week, 20–25 February 1944. They received a Distinguished Unit Citation for aggressiveness in seeking out and destroying enemy aircraft and in attacking enemy air bases during the period 5 March – 24 April 1944.

The 4 FG flew interdiction and counter-air missions during the invasion of Normandy in June 1944 and supported the airborne invasion of the Netherlands in September. They participated in the Battle of the Bulge, December 1944 – January 1945, and provided cover for the airborne assault across the Rhine in March 1945.

Cold War

The 4th Fighter Group was inactivated at Camp Kilmer, New Jersey, on 10 November 1945. The unit was reactivated at Selfridge Field, Michigan, 9 September 1946, as the United States began to rearm due to Cold War pressures.

On 15 August 1947, under the Wing/Base (Hobson) reorganization plan, the 4th Fighter Wing was formed, and the 4th Fighter Group became its subordinate operational flying component. Following a period of training with F-80 Shooting Star aircraft, the 4th Fighter Group transitioned to F-86 Sabre jets in March 1949, just in time for advanced training and entry into the Korean War.

In December 1950, the 4th Fighter Wing's flying component (now the 4th Fighter-Interceptor Group) was the first unit to commit F-86 Sabre jets to that conflict. Lt Col Bruce H. Hinton shot down a MiG-15 on 17 December during the first Sabre mission of the war. Four days later, Lt Col John C. Meyer, a World War II ace, led a flight of eight sabres against 15 MiGs in the first major all-jet fighter battle in history. The flight downed six MiGs without sustaining any losses.

By the end of the war airmen of the 4th Fighter-Interceptor Group had destroyed 502 enemy aircraft (54 percent of the total), becoming the top fighter unit of the Korean War. Twenty-four pilots achieved ace status.  With the 4th Fighter-Interceptor Wing, the group moved to Japan following the Korean armistice in 1953, continuing training and tours to Korea. The group was inactivated on 8 December 1957 with its component squadrons assigned directly to the wing as the Air Force reorganized its wings into the tri-deputate structure.

Modern era

On 22 April 1991, the 4th Operations Group was activated as a result of the 4th Tactical Fighter Wing implementing the USAF objective wing organization. Upon activation, the 4 OG retained the lineage and history of the 4th Fighter Group. The 4 OG was assigned the 334th, 335th and 336th Fighter Squadrons upon activation, all equipped with the F-15E Strike Eagle.

In addition to the objective wing organization, the 4 TFW became the Air Force's first composite wing and was redesignated the 4th Wing. The 4th Wing incorporated under it all the people, KC-10 aircraft, and assets of the 68th Air Refueling Wing, a Strategic Air Command unit, with the 344th and 911th Air Refueling Squadron (ARS) being assigned to the 4 OG.

With the reorganization of the USAF major command structure, the unit's parent organization became part of the new Air Combat Command on 1 June 1992.

More changes occurred in the early 1990s. The 911 ARS was reassigned to Air Mobility Command bases in 1994 and 1995 and the F-15E formal training unit moved to Seymour Johnson in 1994 and 1995. The 333d Fighter Squadron returned to Seymour Johnson to accommodate the training mission and was assigned to the 4 OG. To accommodate the need to train more F-15E aircrews, the 334th Fighter Squadron became a training squadron on 1 January 1996.

Fewer resources and the need to use all Air Force assets to meet increased operational commitments called for yet another reorganization as the 20th Century came to a close. The expeditionary aerospace force concept was implemented to conform to the Air Force vision to organize, train, equip, deploy and sustain itself in the 21st Century global security environment. Under the concept, the 4 OG is one of two on-call rapid response aerospace expeditionary groups. The Fourth was the first to assume this on-call mission on 1 October 1999.

Global War on Terrorism
In October 2001, in response to the 11 September terrorist attacks on the United States, the 4 OG began flying Operation NOBLE EAGLE sorties, the first of its kind for the wing, providing coastal protection for Homeland Defense.

In January 2002, the 4 OG arrived in Kuwait in support of Operations SOUTHERN WATCH and ENDURING FREEDOM, flying missions over Iraq and Afghanistan. On 1 March 2002, Operation ANACONDA was launched, and the group's mission was to provide close air support into Afghanistan. Operation ANACONDA ended 21 March 2002 with the 4 OG's greatest highlight being their performance at Roberts Ridge. Members of the 335th Fighter Squadron successfully suppressed enemy fire from al-Qaida troops, as Army and Air Force personnel retrieved stranded and fallen comrades.

In January and February 2003, the 4th Operations Group joined other operational units in Southeast Asia. Two F-15E fighter squadrons deployed to Southwest Asia in support of OSW, which would later transition into support for Operation IRAQI FREEDOM. On 18 April 2003, members of the 4th Operations Group returned to Seymour Johnson AFB after contributing to the initial U.S. led coalition invasion in Operation IRAQI FREEDOM.

Lineage
 Constituted as 4th Fighter Group (Single Engine) on 22 August 1942
 Activated on 12 September 1942
 Inactivated on 10 November 1945
 Activated on 9 September 1946
 Redesignated: 4th Fighter Group, Jet Propelled on 23 April 1947
 Redesignated: 4th Fighter Group, Jet on 14 June 1948
 Redesignated: 4th Fighter-Interceptor Group on 20 January 1950
 Redesignated: 4th Fighter-Bomber Group on 8 March 1955
 Redesignated: 4th Fighter-Day Group on 25 April 1956
 Inactivated on 8 December 1957
 Redesignated: 4th Tactical Fighter Group on 31 July 1985 (remained inactive)
 Redesignated: 4th Operations Group on 17 April 1991
 Activated on 22 April 1991.

Assignments

 VIII Fighter Command, 12 September 1942
 4th Air Defense Wing, 30 June 1943
 65th Fighter Wing, 7 August 1943
 Attached to: 2d Bombardment (later Air) Division, 15 September 1944 – November 1945
 Fifteenth Air Force, 9 September 1946

 Strategic Air Command, 31 March 1947
 4th Fighter (later, 4th Fighter-Interceptor; 4th Fighter-Bomber; 4th Fighter-Day) Wing, 15 August 1947 – 8 December 1957
 4th Wing (later, 4th Fighter Wing), 22 April 1991–present

Components
 7th Fighter-Bomber Squadron: attached 15 April–October 1957
 333d Fighter Squadron: 1 October 1994–present
 334th Fighter (later, 334th Fighter-Interceptor; 334th Fighter-Bomber; 334th Fighter-Day; 334th Tactical Fighter; 334th Fighter) Squadron: 12 September 1942 – 10 November 1945; 9 September 1946 – 8 December 1957 (detached 1 May – 26 June 1951; 1 July – 8 December 1957); 22 April 1991–present
 335th Fighter (later, 335th Fighter-Interceptor; 335th Fighter-Bomber; 335th Fighter-Day; 335th Tactical Fighter; 335th Fighter) Squadron: 12 September 1942 – 10 November 1945; 9 September 1946 – 8 December 1957 (detached 20 September – 3 November 1951; not operational 15 September – 8 December 1957); 22 April 1991–present
 336th Fighter (later, 336th Fighter-Interceptor; 336th Fighter-Bomber; 336th Fighter-Day; 336th Tactical Fighter; 336th Fighter) Squadron: 12 September 1942 – 10 November 1945; 9 September 1946 – 8 December 1957 (detached 27 June – 19 September 1951; 19 November 1954 – 8 December 1957); 22 April 1991–present
 339th Fighter-Interceptor Squadron: attached c. 25 November 1954 – 15 September 1957
 344th Air Refueling Squadron: 22 April 1991 – 29 April 1994
 711th Air Refueling Squadron: 29 April – 1 October 1994
 744th Air Refueling Squadron: 29 April 1994 – 1 December 1995
 911th Air Refueling Squadron: 22 April 1991 – 29 April 1994.

Stations

 RAF Bushey Hall (AAF-341), England, 12 September 1942
 RAF Debden (AAF-156), England, 29 September 1942
 RAF Steeple Morden (AAF-122), England, c. 23 July – 4 November 1945
 Camp Kilmer, New Jersey, 9–10 November 1945
 Selfridge Field, Michigan, 9 September 1946
 Andrews Field (later, AFB), Maryland, 26 March 1947
 Langley AFB, Virginia, 30 April 1949

 New Castle County Airport, Delaware, 14 August – 10 November 1950
 Johnson AB, Japan, 13 December 1950
 Suwon AB (K-13), South Korea, 30 March 1951
 Kimpo AB (K-14), South Korea, 23 August 1951
 Chitose Air Base, Japan, c. 25 November 1954 – 8 December 1957
 Seymour Johnson AFB, North Carolina, 22 April 1991–present

Aircraft

 Supermarine Spitfire, 1942–1943
 P-47 Thunderbolt, 1943–1944; 1947
 P-51 Mustang, 1944–1945; (later F-51), 1948–1949
 P-80 (later F-80) Shooting Star, 1947–1949

 F-86 Sabre, 1949–1957
 F-15E Strike Eagle, 1991–present
 KC-10 Extender, 1991–1995.

Awards
 
 Presidential Unit Citation
 France, 5 March 1944 – 24 April 1944
 Korea, 22 Apr 1951 – 8 July 1951
 Korea, 9 July 1951 –  27 November 1951
 
 Air Force Meritorious Unit Award
 1 June 2008 – 30 April 2010
 
 Air Force Outstanding Unit Award
 23 April 1991 – 31 March 1993
 1 June 1998 – 31 May 2000
 1 June 2000 – 31 May 2002
 1 June 2002 – 31 May 2003
 
 Korean Presidential Unit Citation
 1 November 1951 – 30 September 1952
 1 October 1952 – 31 March 1953
 
 European Theatre of World War II
 Campaigns

 Air Offensive Europe
 Normandy
 Northern France

 Rhineland
 Ardennes-Alsace
 Central Europe

 
 Korean Service Medal
 Campaigns

 Chinese Communist Forces Intervention
 1st United Nations Counteroffensive
 Chinese Communist Forces Spring Offensive
 United Nations Summer-Fall Offensive

 Second Korean Winter
 Korea Summer-Fall 1952
 Third Korean Winter
 Korea Summer-Fall 1953

Emblems

Notes

References and Bibliography

  (ISBN is for 2005 Potomac Books reprint)
  
  
 
  
 
  
  
  
  
  
  
  
 
 
 
  
  
 Seymour Johnson AFB 4th Operations Group Factsheet

External links
 The Association of the 4th Fighter Group – World War II

004
Military units and formations in North Carolina